Intellisample is the brand name for Nvidia's anti-aliasing method in GeForce graphics cards.

Intellisample 4.0
Version 4.0 is used in the GeForce 6 and GeForce 7 series, and includes two new methods, transparency supersampling (TSAA) and the faster but lower-quality transparency multisampling (TMAA). These methods are designed to improve anti-aliasing quality of scenes with partially transparent textures (such as chain link fences) and textures at oblique angles to the viewing screen.

Intellisample 4.0 support was enabled, unannounced, for GeForce 6 Series cards in NVIDIA's display driver (Forceware), version 91.45. This is not mentioned in the driver Release Notes or on Nvidia's website.

References
 HKEPC

External links
 Official Intellisample homepage
 Nvidia GeForce Tweak Guide

Nvidia